Pirates of the 20th Century (translit. Piraty XX veka) is a 1980 Soviet action/adventure film about modern piracy. The film was directed by Boris Durov, the story was written by Boris Durov and Stanislav Govorukhin.

The film was the leader of Soviet distribution in 1980 and had 87.6 million viewers. It was highest grossing domestically-produced film in the Soviet Union.

Plot 

The film begins with a convoy of military vehicles rolling into a seaport located somewhere in Middle East in the bank of Indian or Pacific Ocean and stopping near the pier where the Soviet cargo ship Nezhin is anchored. An agent of a local pharmaceutical company meets the captain of the Soviet vessel and discusses the cargo, medical opium, which is in critical demand by the hospitals of the USSR. Soon after that the pharmaceutical company agent is seen inside a car, speaking to someone via walkie-talkie.  Later the MV Nezhin, with the opium on board, leaves port for Vladivostok.

Some distance into the voyage, a watchman cries "man overboard" and the captain orders the engines stopped to rescue the stranded swimmer. The boat from Nezhin picks up an Asian man who identifies himself as Salekh, the only surviving sailor from a foreign merchant ship. Salekh told the crew that his ship suddenly capsized during a heavy storm and his crewmates were fighting for places in rescue boats. Shortly after that the Soviet captain is informed of an unknown ship, drifting nearby. The ship, called the Mercury, is apparently abandoned, with no crew visible and no activity on deck. The captain of the Nezhin decides to send four men to explore the ship and offer assistance to possible survivors.

However, the abandoned ship turns out to be a trap for the Soviets. Occupied with the Mercury, none of the Russian crewmen pays any attention to Salekh, who takes an axe from the ship's firefighting kit, enters the radio room of the Nezhin, and attacks a radio operator, killing him. After Salekh destroys the ship's radio equipment, the Mercury starts her engines and approaches the Nezhin. At that moment, the Nezhin'''s crew see the bodies of the boarding party, floating in the water behind the Mercury. The Soviet captain realizes that his ship is under attack by pirates.

Their attempt to escape is foiled when the Mercury rams the ship and the pirates open fire with assault rifles and machine guns. The pirates board the Nezhin, brutally killing Russian crew members who fight them. Sergey, the chief-mate of the Nezhin, discovers the dead radio operator and decides to find Salekh. Chasing Salekh through the corridors of the ship, Sergey makes an attempt to stop him. Salekh shows impressive martial arts skills and quickly defeats the chief-mate. Soon after, the pirates lock the remaining Russians into crew compartments and begin to offload the opium to the Mercury. The pirate captain thanks Salekh for a successful mission and orders him to blow up the Nezhin together with her crew. The Soviets, left to die on a sinking ship, manage to escape and must fight the pirates for survival.

Cast
 Nikolai Yeremenko Jr. as Sergey Sergeyevich (Chief Engineer)
 Pyotr Velyaminov as Ivan Ilych (Soviet Captain)
 Talgat Nigmatulin as Salekh
 Rein Aren as Captain of Pirates
 Dilorom Kambarova as Island girl
 Natalya Khorokhorina as Mascha
 Igor Kashintsev as Agent Lotus
 Dzhigangir Shakhmuradov as Noah
 Igor Klass as Joachim Schweiggert
 Tadeush Kasyanov as Bosun
 Maija Eglīte as Aina
 Alexander Bespaly as Chief mate
 Viktor Zhiganov as Igor Stetsenko
 Georgy Martirosyan as Georgiy Kluyev
 Leonid Trutnev as Radio operator
 Vladimir Smirnov as Political commissar
 Viktor Gordeyev as Yura Mikosha
 Vladimir Yepiskoposyan as Bearded pirate
 Farkhat Aminov

See alsoA Hijacking, a 2012 film on piracy in the Indian OceanCaptain Phillips'', a 2013 American thriller about modern-day piracy off Somalia, directed by Paul Greengrass, starring Tom Hanks and Barkhad Abdi
Survival film

References

External links

USSR Blockbuster: 20th Century Pirates

1980 films
1980s action adventure films
1980s Russian-language films
Gorky Film Studio films
1980 martial arts films
Pirate films
Soviet action adventure films
Films directed by Boris Durov